Deogratias of Carthage was a North African Christian prelate who served as Bishop of Carthage from 454 to 457. He was the first bishop in 14 years and after him the seat was empty for 23 years till Saint Eugenius of Carthage.

The name Deogratias means "thanks be to God." He was appointed a bishop, because there was no bishop for 14 years since the last bishop Quodvultdeus and priests had been arrested and banished by Genseric, the Homoian king of the Vandals, who captured the city of Carthage in 439. Deogratias sold all the gold, silver, vessels, works of art, vestments and ornaments of the church to buy the slaves back from the vandals and filled two of the largest churches in the city, the Basilica Fausti and the Basilica Novarum, with bedding to provide accommodation and also started a mess to provide daily food to them. He died in 457 at Carthage. After his death, the Vandals did not allow another bishop for 23 years. His feast is celebrated on 5 January and 22 March. He was buried secretly to avoid chaos as people had gathered in numbers at his funeral to get a relic of the saint.

References

Date of birth unknown
457 deaths
5th-century Christian saints
African saints
5th-century bishops of Carthage
5th-century archbishops
Saints from the Vandal Kingdom